Geneva is a city in, and the county seat of, Fillmore County, Nebraska, United States.  The population was 2,217 at the 2010 census.

History
Geneva was founded in 1871. It was named after Geneva, in Switzerland, perhaps via Geneva, New York.

Government
Geneva uses a city council consisting of six members that serve four-year terms. As of April 2020, the current mayor of Geneva is Eric Kamler.

Geography
Geneva is located at  (40.526288, -97.601885).

The city serves as the Fillmore County seat and is home to the historic Fillmore County Courthouse. This two-story brick building was built in 1894 and has a prominent three-story clock tower which was installed by jeweler W.P. McCall in 1909. The courthouse underwent a multimillion-dollar restoration and conservation project and is listed on the National Register of Historic Places.

Geneva is located approximately 24 miles (39 km) south of Interstate 80 on U.S. Route 81, which is a part of the Pan American Highway, connecting Canada to Mexico.

Climate

Demographics

2010 census
As of the census of 2010, there were 2,217 people, 926 households, and 585 families living in the city. The racial makeup of the city was 95.9% White, 1.3% African American, 0.9% Native American, 0.7% from other races, and 1.2% from two or more races. Hispanic or Latino of any race were 3.1% of the population.

There were 926 households, of which 27.9% had children under the age of 18 living with them, 53.2% were married couples living together, 7.0% had a female householder with no husband present, 2.9% had a male householder with no wife present, and 36.8% were non-families. 34.4% of all households were made up of individuals, and 19.5% had someone living alone who was 65 years of age or older. The average household size was 2.25 and the average family size was 2.87.

The median age in the city was 44.3 years. 26.2% of residents were under the age of 18; 5.2% were between the ages of 18 and 24; 19.4% were from 25 to 44; 24.6% were from 45 to 64; and 24.4% were 65 years of age or older. The gender makeup of the city was 46.5% male and 53.5% female.

2000 census
As of the census of 2000, there were 2,226 people, 957 households, and 618 families living in the city. The population density was 1,486.5 people per square mile (573.0/km). There were 1,050 housing units at an average density of 701.2 per square mile (270.3/km). The racial makeup of the city was 99.01% White, 0.04% African American, 0.27% Native American, 0.45% from other races, and 0.22% from two or more races. Hispanic or Latino of any race were 0.81% of the population.

There were 957 households, out of which 27.3% had children under the age of 18 living with them, 55.7% were married couples living together, 6.2% had a female householder with no husband present, and 35.4% were non-families. 33.0% of all households were made up of individuals, and 18.4% had someone living alone who was 65 years of age or older. The average household size was 2.24 and the average family size was 2.83.

In the city, the population was spread out, with 23.1% under the age of 18, 5.1% from 18 to 24, 23.2% from 25 to 44, 23.2% from 45 to 64, and 25.4% who were 65 years of age or older. The median age was 44 years. For every 100 females, there were 89.1 males. For every 100 females age 18 and over, there were 81.4 males.

As of 2000 the median income for a household in the city was $32,500, and the median income for a family was $40,096. Males had a median income of $30,357 versus $17,534 for females. The per capita income for the city was $18,349. About 2.4% of families and 5.6% of the population were below the poverty line, including 3.2% of those under age 18 and 7.1% of those age 65 or over.

Education
Fillmore Central Elementary and High School are the public schools in Geneva.

Grace Lutheran Elementary School is a Christian school of the Wisconsin Evangelical Lutheran Synod in Geneva.

Notable people
 Robert B. Wilson, Nobel prize in Economics, 2020
 Kate Barnard, first woman elected to statewide office in Oklahoma
 Maggie Malone, collegiate javelin throw record-holder and Olympic athlete
 Terry Murrell, President of Western Iowa Tech Community College
 John E. Nelson, member of the Nebraska Legislature

References

External links

 Fillmore Central High School
 Fillmore County

Cities in Nebraska
Cities in Fillmore County, Nebraska
County seats in Nebraska